Aero bike also known as "Aerodynamic bike" is a  type of road bike that uses aerodynamics principles in its operation. The bike's geometrical makeup allows the hands and body position of the rider to change given the terrain, rider's preference, and  race situation. The term is also used for aerodynamic motorcycles.

History
The  first  construction of aero bike started out as a styling project that featured an extended aerodynamic front with spoilers and advance guard bodywork in early 1985. In the same year, the first aero bike named  "Aero-D-Zero" was constructed around a steel trellis frame and bevel drive Ducati motor of Mike Brosnan. The bike was first used in  March 1987 BEARS speed trial. It later won the 1988 and 1990 speed trials with speeds of 242.72 km/h and 247.80 km/h respectively.

Meanwhile, increased use of aero bikes was seen 1989 when  US road riders started showing great concern with aerodynamics in bicycle riding games. That was when Greg LeMond won the Tour de France over Laurent Fignon by 58 seconds in the final stage time trial. Shortly after the event, bike manufacturers started producing aero wheels,  aero helmets, and  aero  clothing materials  meant for road bike-racing. Since that time till date,  most multi-sport bike companies  have continued to manufacture aero bikes. Today, almost every bike vendor offers aero bikes of various brands across the globe.

Components
Modern day aero bike comes with aerodynamic components such as aero wheels and aero helmets. Most brands also come with a combination of gears, carbon framing and strong durable wheels.

Uses
Aero bike is generally used for  bike riding competitions, riding tours and personal bike riding sport.

Advantages
Aero bike comes with the following advantages:
 Makes use of aerodynamics principles
 Comes with durable wheels that withstand friction in motion
 Easy changing of gears 
 Fast operation

Disadvantages
Aero bike comes with the following disadvantages:
 Heavier than a comparable non-aero bike
 Could be stiff sometimes when in use
 Long and low race geometry

See also
 Aerodynamics
 Fixed-gear bicycle
 Hybrid bicycle
 Racing bicycle
 Road bicycle
 Time trial bicycle
 Velomobile

References

Cycle types
Road bicycle racing terminology